1975 Országos Bajnokság I (men's water polo) was the 69th water polo championship in Hungary. There were twelve teams who played two-round match for the title.

Final list 

* M: Matches W: Win D: Drawn L: Lost G+: Goals earned G-: Goals got P: Point

Sources 
Gyarmati Dezső: Aranykor (Hérodotosz Könyvkiadó és Értékesítő Bt., Budapest, 2002.)

Országos Bajnokság I
Országos Bajnokság I (men's water polo)
Seasons in Hungarian water polo competitions